Rosenthal GmbH is a German manufacturer of porcelain products and other household goods. The original firm was founded in 1879 in Selb, Bavaria. Since 2009, Rosenthal has been owned by the Italian company Sambonet Paderno Industrie (Arcturus Group).

History 
Rosenthal was originally founded in 1879 as a family business. The founder, Philipp Rosenthal, moved his porcelain painting from Werl in North Rhine-Westphalia to Selb in Bavaria, where he industrialized in the castle Erkersreuth with his painting workshop. In 1897, Philipp Rosenthal founded the company Bauer, Rosenthal & Co. in Kronach, as well as Philipp Rosenthal & Co. AG. In 1908, Rosenthal bought the porcelain manufacturer Thomas in Marktredwitz, and the porcelain company Zeidler & Co. in 1917.

In 1921, the company took over the Krister Porzellanmanufaktur in Wałbrzych, Silesia. The factory was closed in 1945, but the brand was revived in 1951 and used until 1971.

In the period of national socialism, Philipp Rosenthal, while Catholic, had to withdraw from the enterprise in 1934 because of his Jewish origin. The Board of Management and the supervisory board turned against Rosenthal and implemented various measures to prevent Philipp Rosenthal from using his voting shares in order to change the composition of the management board and the supervisory board. The government was asked for support and sold the voting shares to persons who were not well-disposed towards Rosenthal. However, the Nazi regime did not go directly against Philipp Rosenthal in order not to jeopardize the foreign business of the company. The reasonably covertly concealed Aryans took advantage of the family, and urged Rosenthal's successor to step out of the company. Philipp Rosenthal's death in 1937 finally paved the way for his grandchildren.
In 1936, Rosenthal bought the porcelain manufacturers Waldershof and Thomas in Weidenberg-Sophienthal. Rosenthal Isolatoren GmbH (RIG) was established in 1939 with branches in Erkersreuth (Selb) and Hennigsdorf near Berlin. In 1939 the company changed to Rosenthal Porzellan AG. When the Decree on Companies of Deprived Commercial Enterprises (RGBI 1941, p. 177), adopted on 27 March 1941, forced the discontinuation of the Jewish company and brand name Rosenthal, the "Aryan" management intervened through Joseph Goebbels to continue the use of the Rosenthal brand name.

With the return of Philipp Rosenthal's son Philip Rosenthal from exile and his entry into the enterprise in 1950, he won a pioneering role in the modern product design. In 1960, the Rosenthal Studiohaus was opened in Nuremberg, from which the world's first design chain was built.  In 1965 the uniform name Rosenthal Glas & Porzellan AG was elected and shortened to Rosenthal AG in 1969. In 1972, Philip Rosenthal founded the furniture factory Rosenthal Einrichtung in Espelkamp. The furniture factory was renamed in 2009 Philip Möbelmanufaktur GmbH and in  2013 rebranded the Fröscher GmbH & CO. KG.  Rosenthal, In collaboration with industrial designers such as Raymond Loewy, Tapio Wirkkala, Elsa Fischer-Treyden, Timo Sarpaneva, Verner Panton and Luigi Colani, created an impressive series of products. Walter Gropius design for Rosenthal the tea service TAC.  In 1967, Rosenthal built the so-called "Glassmaker's Cathedral," a factory for the Thomas-Glassworks in Amberg.  The Thomas-Glassworks was renamed the Amberg crystal glass factory.

In 1997, Rosenthal AG was 90% owned by the British-Irish Waterford Wedgwood Group. Rosenthal was the market leader for high-quality porcelain and glassware in Germany and was the world market leader in conjunction with Waterford Wedgwood. In the year 2000, the company took over the Hutschenreuther brand and Hutschenreuther-Werk B in Selb.

In June 2008, the Waterford Wedgwood Group wanted to divest the Rosenthal share package due to liquidity difficulties. At this time, around 1,100 employees were employed worldwide. The company, faced with insolvency by the subsequent collapse of Waterford Wedgwood, filed for insolvency on 9 January 2009. The subsequent insolvency proceedings of Rosenthal AG were opened on 1 April 2009 by the District Court. On 20 July 2009, a sale was announced to an Italian company, Sambonet Paderno Industrie (Arcturus Group). Founded on 1 August 2009, Rosenthal GmbH is an independent part of Sambonet Paderno Industrie (Arcturus Group). The Rosenthal company headquarters remain in Selb under the managing director Pierluigi Coppo.

The Rosenthal Archive, a collection of around 15,000 exhibits from 130 years of company history, were purchased by the Oberfranken Foundation on 12 August 2009 and is provided as a permanent loan to the Porzellanikon, the State Museum of Porcelain in Hohenberg an der Eger, Selb. These include nearly all product designs, from the company's foundation to today, as well as originals designed by artists such as Salvador Dalí, Andy Warhol, Wilhelm Wagenfeld and Walter Gropius.

Designers

Brands 
 Rosenthal studio-line, design-oriented crockery and art objects made of porcelain and glass
 Rosenthal classic, classic-design porcelain
 Rosenthal meets Versace, luxury porcelain in collaboration with Versace (since 1992)
 Thomas (owned by Rosenthal since 1908), design-oriented mass use porcelain
 Hutschenreuther (owned by Rosenthal since 2000), general porcelain for homes and hotels
 Arzberg (owned by Rosenthal since 2013)
 Arthur Krupp, an inexpensive line for the hospitality industry

Gallery

Literature 
 Dieter Struß: Rosenthal. Service, figures, ornamental and art objects. Battenberg, Augsburg 1995,  (English translation 1997).

References

External links 

 Rosenthal – consumer website
 Rosenthal – corporate webpage
 
 

1879 establishments
Ceramics manufacturers of Germany
German brands
Companies based in Bavaria
Companies established in 1879
German porcelain
Companies acquired from Jews under Nazi rule